Praxidike , also known as , is a retrograde irregular satellite  of Jupiter. It was discovered by a team of astronomers from the University of Hawaii led by Scott S. Sheppard in 2000, and given the temporary designation .

It was named in August 2003 after Praxidike, the Greek goddess of punishment.

Orbit

Praxidike orbits Jupiter at an average distance of 20,824,000 km in 609.25 days, at an inclination of 144° to the ecliptic (143° to Jupiter's equator), in a retrograde direction and with an eccentricity of 0.1840.

Praxidike belongs to the Ananke group, believed to be the remnants of a break-up of a captured heliocentric asteroid. With an estimated diameter of 7 km, Praxidike is the second largest member of the group after Ananke itself (assumed albedo of 0.04).

Characteristics
The satellite appears grey (colour indices B-V=0.77, R-V= 0.34), typical of C-type asteroids.

References

 Ephemeris IAU-MPC NSES
 Mean orbital parameters NASA JPL

External links
David Jewitt pages
Scott Sheppard pages

Ananke group
Moons of Jupiter
Irregular satellites
Discoveries by Scott S. Sheppard
20001123
Moons with a retrograde orbit